Minolia strigata is a species of sea snail, a marine gastropod mollusk in the family Solariellidae.

Description
The height of the shell attains 5 mm, its diameter also 5 mm. The grayish white shell has a conical-turbinate shape and is deeply umbilicate. It has a high spire. It is stained with spots in flames that are generally longitudinally arranged. The shell contains 5–6 whorls that are noticeably bicarinate. They contain oblique fine-drawn stripes. The body whorl is subquadrate, tricarinate and gently convex at its base. It contains radial striae. The deep umbilicus is subcircular and contains numerous slender plicae. The aperture is subcircular. The peristome is simple.

This species is allied to Minolia singaporensis Pilsbry, 1889 but is larger and proportionately shorter, with three prominent keels on the body whorl and one bordering the umbilical cord.

Distribution
This species occurs off Hong Kong.

References
.

External links

strigata
Gastropods described in 1894